The Spanjaardenkasteel ("Spaniards' Castle") was a castle in the city of Ghent in present-day Belgium. 

The castle was commissioned in 1540 by the Holy Roman Emperor and Spanish king Charles V after he crushed a rebellion by the city. The castle housed a garrison of about 2,500 men. The castle was eventually demolished in the 19th century.

References

External links

Castles in Belgium
Castles in East Flanders
Demolished buildings and structures in Belgium
Buildings and structures in Ghent
Fortifications in Spain and its Empire
Charles V, Holy Roman Emperor
Tourist attractions in Ghent